Sainte-Croix (also Sainte-Croix-de-Beaumont; Languedocien: Senta Crotz) is a commune in the Dordogne department in Nouvelle-Aquitaine in southwestern France.

The village has an ancient church and attached building that used to belong to the Knights Templar. The mayor of Sainte-Croix is Francis Montaudouin, elected in 2020. Sainte-Croix lies about 3 km to the east of the D660 road that links Beaumont-du-Périgord in the north and Monpazier in the south.

Population

See also
Barjou
Communes of the Dordogne department

References

External links

 Official website
 Website about Sainte-Croix

Communes of Dordogne